The 2006 South Carolina Gamecocks football team represented the University of South Carolina in the Southeastern Conference during the 2006 NCAA Division I FBS football season. The Gamecocks were led by Steve Spurrier in his second season as USC head coach and played their home games in Williams-Brice Stadium in Columbia, South Carolina.

Schedule
The October 28 game against Tennessee played host to ESPN's College Gameday, the third year in a row that South Carolina had hosted the program.

References

South Carolina
South Carolina Gamecocks football seasons
Liberty Bowl champion seasons
South Carolina Gamecocks football